Nicole Provis and Mark Woodforde were the defending champions but only Woodforde competed that year with Martina Navratilova.

Navratilova and Woodforde lost in the final 6–3, 7–6(8–6) against Helena Suková and Todd Woodbridge.

Seeds
Champion seeds are indicated in bold text while text in italics indicates the round in which those seeds were eliminated.

Draw

Final

Top half

Bottom half

References
1993 US Open – Doubles draws and results at the International Tennis Federation

Mixed Doubles
US Open (tennis) by year – Mixed doubles